GEMS Education, founded as Global Education Management Systems (GEMS), is an Indian Emirati-based education company. Founded by Sunny Varkey, the firm provides pre-school, primary, and secondary education. Through its consultancy arm, GEMS Education Solutions, the company works internationally with public and private sector clients on school improvement initiatives.

Founded and headquartered in Dubai, the firm has offices in the United Kingdom, the United States, Singapore, India, Saudi Arabia, Qatar, Egypt, Kenya, and the United Arab Emirates.

GEMS Education is a for-profit entity with US$1.8 million in term loans and notes issued by its Cayman Island subsidiary, and carries a Long-Term Issuer Default Rating (IDR) of 'B' with a Stable Outlook from Fitch.

History

Early schools and the Varkey Group
GEMS Education had its roots in a family tutoring business in Dubai started by Indian-born teachers K.S. and Mariama Varkey in 1959. The discovery of oil in Dubai in 1966 brought in many foreign workers to the undeveloped emirate, including many from the Indian subcontinent. With the increased demand for an English-language education for the children of Indian expatriates, the Varkeys founded Our Own English High School in Dubai in 1968.

When in 1980 local authorities insisted that Our Own English High School be housed in a purpose-built facility, the Varkeys' son Sunny Varkey took over the operation of the school, which had fewer  than 400 students at the time. He expanded the school, and added new schools as well. The education situation in Dubai was ripe for expansion, since local schools were only for native Arabs, and the children of the ever-increasing number of expats needed education of their own. Under his umbrella business organization the Varkey Group, Sunny Varkey opened Indian, Pakistani, and British schools,  and offered education under the different curricula: Indian (Central Board of Secondary Education and Indian Certificate of Secondary Education), U.S., British, and later International Baccalaureate, French, and dual and local curricula.

Founding of GEMS
After creating a network of schools in the Gulf Arab states, in 2000 Varkey established Global Education Management Systems (GEMS), an advisory and educational management firm, in advance of his overseas expansion. In 2003, he began opening GEMS schools in England, beginning with Sherborne House in Hampshire and Bury Lawn in Milton Keynes. Soon afterwards, he took over Sherfield School in Hampshire, and purchased another 10 schools in England, mainly in the north.

In 2004, the  group opened its first schools in India. It continued to add schools in the subcontinent, d also purchased a controlling interest in the India-based Everonn Education, which the Varkey Group and GEMS manage. GEMS subsequently opened schools in Africa, Southeast Asia, the U.S., and Europe. Its two schools in the U.S. are in Chicago: a pre-school, and the pre-school through elementary school GEMS World Academy-Chicago, which opened in 2014 to eventually extend through grade 12.

In 2010 the firm became an official member of the World Economic Forum (WEF) as one of WEF's Global Growth Companies. In 2012, it became a  Global Growth Company 'Partner', entitling it to attend the World Economic Forum's flagship annual meeting in Davos. Also in 2010, former U.S. president Bill Clinton named GEMS Education a strategic partner of the Clinton Global Initiative, which convened global leaders to devise and implement innovative solutions to some of the world's pressing challenges.

In 2012 the firm received the School of Educators Global Education Awards' Lifetime Achievement Award for Global School Education. That year it was also named Education Company of the Year at the Gulf Business Industry Awards, and it also received that same award in 2013.

Structure and philosophy
The schools are established in various price brackets, to serve various markets and income levels. The more expensive schools have spacious grounds and amenities such as golf and tennis facilities, as well as smaller class sizes. The budget schools are operated by hiring teachers from low income countries such as India, South Africa and Philippines that a salary 50% compared to earnings of western trained teachers in the same schools. The teachers are also eligible for budget housing compared to their colleagues. In most budget schools, two teachers in the same school will receive vastly different salary levels, and those from India or South Africa will receive a lower class of accommodation.

When entering into new markets, according to  the firm, its schools also benefit from local partners who understand local conditions, and provide local knowledge that may not be obvious through standard market research. In recent new ventures it partnered with Maarif for Education in KSA. The firm relied heavily on its Dubai-based teams to ensure the opening of a new school due to the lack of understanding with their partner. Many new staff were lost in the process and those which were hired to KSA resigned due to the poor working standard and bureaucracy challenges between GEMS and Maarif.

According to the company, its schools aim to instill students with universal values, and to form graduates who are global citizens with leadership qualities. The company states that the schools aimsto equip children to live in a multicultural environment, and stresses the importance of giving back to others both locally and globally.

GEMS Education Solutions
GEMS Education Solutions is the consultancy arm of GEMS Education, providing educational services and advice. It was established in 2011, taking on projects mainly in the UK, Africa, and Asia. It works with governments and non-profits, and public and private clients.

One of its projects has been assisting and advising the state school system in the United Arab Emirates. And in Saudi Arabia, via the Oxford Partnership, GEMS Education Solutions has co-managed three newly built women's vocational colleges; the three-year diploma programmes include training in IT, communication, basic sciences, and English language, before moving on to specialisation and on-the-job training.

In Ghana, the consultancy implemented MGCubed – Making Ghana Girls Great – which equips two classrooms in each Ghanaian primary school with a computer, projector, satellite modem, and solar panels, creating an interactive distance-learning platform to deliver both formal in-school teaching and informal after-school training. The project teaches 8,000 students in 72 Ghanaian schools, and was Sub-Saharan Africa's first interactive distance-learning project. The program has aimed to prevent dropping out and under-achieving among girls; students participate more in these classes, in contrast to the standard system of learning by rote, and the video system also cuts down on teacher absenteeism.

In 2014 it published "The Efficiency Index", analyzing which public education systems, by country, deliver the best value for money. Basing its analysis on Programme for International Student Assessment (PISA) scores, the study also detailed teacher salaries and class sizes in nationwide schools. Analyzing the results, The Economist noted the opinion of GEMS' Adam Still that "many of the highest spenders have probably passed 'peak efficiency' – the point at which more money brings diminishing returns", and of PISA's Andreas Schleicher that "Quality of teachers has a clearer impact than class size". Writing in Forbes, Michael Horn wrote that the report does not take into account the extensive after-school tutoring that most public-school students receive in South Korea, which ranked second on the list after Finland. In the BBC News review of the report, it noted that "The study highlights that smaller class sizes or teachers' pay are not necessarily linked to better results", yet conversely "Underpaying teachers can also be seen as 'inefficient' because it is a barrier to recruiting good quality staff – with low pay contributing to Brazil and Indonesia's poor performance in these rankings."

Corporate governance
Sunny Varkey is the founder & executive chairman of GEMS Education. As of 2015, his elder son Dino Varkey is the chief executive officer & a board member of GEMS Education. Sunny's younger son Jay Varkey is an executive director & board member of GEMS Education. C. N. Radhakrishnan is Senior Executive Director, Head of Chairman's Office, and a board member of GEMS Education.

GEMS schools

GEMS in the Middle East and North Africa

United Arab Emirates
GEMS Education was founded in Dubai, and its first school there, Our Own English High School, originally opened in 1968. The company still has its strongest presence in Dubai and in the United Arab Emirates. As of 2017, GEMS had 45 schools in the United Arab Emirates, including 30 in Dubai, 7 in Abu Dhabi, 1 in Fujairah, and 4 in Sharjah. GEMS is the largest education provider in the UAE, and the UAE accounts for more than 90% of its business.

Following its initial years catering mainly to immigrant Indian workers, GEMS grew rapidly in Dubai. As the emirate developed into an international hub, the expat demographics shifted from short-term workers from a few countries to longterm expat residents with their entire families from countries around the world. GEMS adapted with schools for each demographic, varying and adding new curricula and price ranges for each income level and nationality.

The curricula that GEMS schools in the UAE offer include:
Early Years Foundation Stage
International Baccalaureate (IB)
National Curriculum for England
National Curriculum for England and IB
American curriculum
American curriculum and IB
Central Board of Secondary Education (CBSE) (Indian curriculum)
IGCSE (British international pre-IB) and CBSE (Indian)
ICSE / ISC (Indian)

With steadily rising immigration, since public schooling is only available for Emirati natives, demand for private schools in Dubai and the UAE has often outstripped supply, causing lengthy waiting lists at many schools. Many native Emiratis as well choose to send their children to private schools, and since 2011 the number of native Emirati students in GEMS schools has risen faster than any other nationality. Approximately 90% of students in Dubai are in private schools, and with rapidly increasing population, private-school enrolment in Dubai doubled in the decade from 2003 to 2013.

GEMS schools overall in the UAE have had a general reputation for high-quality academic outcomes, outscoring national testing averages and out-performing originating counterparts in official international curricula examinations. Nearly all students have continued on to university.

GEMS UAE has promoted innovation in the UAE and elsewhere. In 2012 GEMS in the UAE partnered with Springside Chestnut Hill Academy in Philadelphia for a three-day Global Entrepreneurship Bootcamp hosted at GEMS Wellington International School in Dubai, bringing students from around the world together to design innovative solutions to local problems, and including meetings with a variety civic leaders. GEMS also provides teacher training for over 70 government schools in Abu Dhabi.

In 2009, GEMS in the UAE implemented a customized virtual learning environment (VLE) across its schools; and in 2013 began installing a Bring Your Own Device (BYOD) wireless system in all of its schools. In February 2015 GEMS launched the Blended Learning Plaza, housed at its GEMS Wellington Academy–SiliconOasis, located in Dubai's Silicon Oasis; the facility provides the latest technology in education, enabling collaborative, online, and blended learning opportunities.

In December 2015, GEMS Education and the UAE Ministry of Education launched an annual UAE National Teacher Prize. The winner receives AED1million, and the 21 top nominees train outside the country at some of the best educational institutions in the world. Winners of the prize, now called the Emirates Innovative Teacher Award, are announced annually in February at the Government Summit.

Selected individual schools
GEMS World Academy in Dubai, which opened in 2008, is the company's flagship school, and as of 2015 was the most expensive school in Dubai. An International Baccalaureate school, its enrolment consists of approximately 2,000 students from more than 80 nationalities. It has a planetarium; facilities for arts, sciences, and languages; a robotics lab; TV, radio, and recording studios; and music rooms with Steinway pianos. Its sports facilities include an Olympic-sized swimming pool, football field, running track, tennis courts, squash courts, skating park, gymnasium, and sports hall with retractable seating. It also has a 650-seat auditorium; an amphitheatre; cafés and a roof-top garden; and on-site breakfast or afternoon clubs for parents to meet teachers.

Our Own English High School in Dubai, now exclusively for girls, had a 2014 enrollment of 10,000 and tuition that is approximately one-tenth that of GEMS World Academy (Dubai), while still maintaining academic excellence. As of 2014 it was the world's largest single-location girls school, offered an Indian curriculum, and had a waiting list of several thousand.

GEMS American Academy, Abu Dhabi was opened in 2011 by Bill Clinton. In September 2013 the school hosted basketball star Kobe Bryant for a basketball skills clinic for selected students, as part of the Kobe Bryant Health and Fitness Weekend in the UAE, co-sponsored by GEMS Education; In 2015 a team of three students from the school competed at New York University's annual Digital Forensics Competition, along with 11 other teams chosen from over 800 teams around the world.

In 2012, Cambridge International School, Dubai was the only school in the UAE to be named by Microsoft as one of the Innovative Pathfinder Schools from around the world. In 2015 the school, which follows the British curriculum, was recognized as the top school for Arabic in Dubai, in the Education Perfect global language-learning competition's second year to include Dubai.

In September 2014, GEMS opened GEMS Sports Academy, which is a two-year full-time education within a professional sports-academy development programme, in Dubai. The sports academy has been initially hosted at GEMS Wellington Academy–SiliconOasis, and offers a two-year International Baccalaureate diploma programme with professional athletics training.

Elsewhere in MENA
In 2010, GEMS took over the management of Kingdom Schools, a subsidiary of Kingdom Holding Company, in Riyadh, Saudi Arabia. The two school campuses, one for boys and one for girls, cover kindergarten through high school and were established in 2000. The school caters to affluent mainly Saudi families, and teaches a bilingual English-Arabic and international curriculum. It contains a number of sports and recreation facilities, science and language labs, and libraries, and includes internet and technological access for each student. In 2012 the school was recognized by the Saudi Green Building Forum for being eco-friendly, and for being the first school in Saudi Arabia to adopt basic sustainability concepts.

In September 2012, GEMS opened The World Academy in King Abdullah Economic City (KAEC) in Saudi Arabia. The academy, which covers kindergarten through high school, was the new city's first school. It offers the International American curriculum leading to International Baccalaureate certification, and according to GEMS was designed to meet international educational standards in the context of Saudi Arabian cultural values. Its new facilities, curriculum, and library featured electronic devices and accessibility, with an English language center for improving English skills. In 2014 construction began to expand the school and add science labs and new design and technology facilities.

In Egypt, GEMS opened Windrose Academy in Cairo in 2013, offering a blended curriculum focused on the National Curriculum of England. GEMS Academy–Alexandria opened in 2014, with an English and French curriculum.

The company opened its first school in Qatar, GEMS American Academy, in September 2014. The school is located in Al Wakrah, and offers an American curriculum based around the United States Common Core State Standards, while according to GEMS still valuing the Islamic faith and Qatar's language, traditions, history, and culture. It provides after-school activities such as Spanish club, cultural dance, choir, robotics, and yoga. It opened initially for kindergarten through grade 5 in 2014, with plans to subsequently expand through high school.

In the fall of 2015, GEMS opened a school featuring the English National Curriculum in Qatar. The school, GEMS Wellington School–Qatar, is located in Al Wakrah and opened with pre-school through grade 6, with plans to expand through high school in subsequent years.

GEMS in Europe

United Kingdom
GEMS acquired and opened schools in England beginning in 2003. Most of its schools in the UK are independent coeducational day schools.

In the fall of 2003, it acquired Sherborne House in Hampshire – a school for ages 3–11 that was founded in 1933. It is sited on a four-acre campus, and in 2013 a new block of classrooms was added. The school offers scholarships in academic subjects, art, sport, and music, and has a special needs provisions unit. In 2014 the school received the Artsmark Gold award designation from Arts Council England.

Also in the fall of 2003, GEMS acquired Bury Lawn School in Milton Keynes, northwest of London. The school had been founded in 1970 and was moved to its current site in 1987, and it caters to ages 3–18.  In 2005, parents complained publicly following the departure of the fourth head teacher in two years; some parents had also objected to the increase in class sizes from 18 to 24 after GEMS acquired the school. GEMS subsequently withdrew from plans to sponsor two academies, or state-funded independent schools, in Milton Keynes.

At Bury Lawn GEMS added a new sports hall, music room, dance and drama studio, ICT lab, and mathematics department in 2004, and in 2006 it refurbished the science department and added four new labs. In September 2011 the school was renamed after urban designer Melvin M. Webber, who was responsible for Milton Keynes' unique city layout, and it became the Webber Independent School, with a new head teacher and a new focus. In 2014 Webber Independent was academically the best-performing school in Milton Keynes in GCSEs, and in 2015 it increased its scores despite nationwide downward trends in GCSE results. In A levels, Webber Independent was also the top-performing school in Milton Keynes from 2014 to 2015.

In 2004, GEMS acquired the site for Sherfield School – the historic estate Sherfield Manor in Hampshire, set on more than 70 acres. The site had previously been a girls' boarding school, North Foreland Lodge, since 1947. GEMS started Sherfield School as a coeducational day school, and added boarding facilities in 2010 and 2015, including residential buildings for students with autism and severe learning disabilities. The school is GEMS' flagship "premium" school in the UK, with fees higher than its mid-range schools. It includes extensive sports grounds, facilities, and training; dance training; and an art gallery and artist-in-residence. The school covers ages 3 months to 18 years, and is an International Baccalaureate school.

In 2004, GEMS also acquired The Hampshire School, Chelsea in Chelsea, London. The school was founded by June Hampshire in Surrey in 1928, and moved to London in 1933. It is an independent co-educational day school for children between the ages of 3 and 13, and since 2009 has been housed in the former historic Chelsea Library, a listed building.

GEMS had acquired The Hampshire School, Chelsea from Nord Anglia Education. At that time in 2004 GEMS acquired a total of 10 schools, seven of them in northern England, from Nord Anglia, which had re-focused on its nursery-school business. In 2007 GEMS announced the sale of Kingswood College in Lancashire to developers, citing the high costs of maintaining its premises, Scarisbrick Hall, a historic 19th-century Grade I listed building; local supporters purchased it and kept it open as a school. By July 2013 GEMS had sold all of its schools in the north of England. After class sizes dropped to less than half, GEMS also sold Bolitho School in Penzance in 2015; GEMS had taken over the school in 2010 when it was in receivership and when pupil numbers were already in decline.

In 2013, GEMS set up GEMS Learning Trust, an education charity with academy-sponsorship status approved by the Department for Education, and established to run no-fee free schools and academies in the UK. It is sponsored by GEMS Education Solutions, the public-sector management and delivery arm of GEMS Education. Its Twickenham Primary Academy opened in September 2015 in Twickenham, Richmond upon Thames, London; beginning with Reception classes it caters to children ages 4 to 11. Its Didcot Primary Academy, for nursery to age 11, opened in September 2016 in Didcot, Oxfordshire in a new development designed to accommodate the town's expanding population.

Switzerland
GEMS' first school in continental Europe was the GEMS World Academy Switzerland, located in Etoy, Switzerland in the Lake Geneva area between Geneva and Lausanne. On 29 May 2019, GEMS announced that GEMS World Academy-Etoy would close on 30 June 2019. An agreement was reached with La Côte International School to ensure enrolment for the school's students.

The school was open for 6 years, having opened in the fall of 2013 for students from pre-school through grade 12, and up to 1,000 students. The school, which was an English-speaking school with an added emphasis on French, catered to the international populace of the area, as well as to local Swiss families seeking an international education for their children. The upscale school also offered merit-based scholarships of 25% to 100% tuition reimbursement for local students.

GEMS World Academy-Etoy was an International Baccalaureate school, and included specialised facilities such as a World Language Learning Centre, an international and high-tech library, radio and TV studios, a music center, and a dyslexia support center. Many of the facilities were also open to the public. Its new-construction sports facilities, which opened in May 2015, included a 25-meter swimming pool, a multi-sport court for basketball, netball, handball, badminton, football, etc., a climbing wall, a fitness room, and a dance studio, and these were available for use by local groups and businesses outside of school hours. The school aimed to distinguish itself as providing a holistic, innovative education focused on forming global citizens with an international vision and enhanced problem-solving skills.

France
In November 2013, GEMS Education acquired its first school in France, Ecole des Roches, a prestigious 60-acre international boarding school founded in 1899 in Normandy. The top-tier school, for students age 6 to 19, caters to a clientele from over 100 countries. GEMS invested €5million for a five-year large-scale expansion, redevelopment, and modernization of the school, making additions including new class buildings and dormitories, a school restaurant, a large entertainment auditorium featuring a theatre with a symphony orchestra pit, a music studio, and a large sports complex. The sports complex included an Olympic swimming pool, ice rinks, 14 tennis courts, numerous sports fields for football, rugby, and squash, martial arts studios, and karting tracks; and a rebuild of the school's runway to re-open its flight training. GEMS made the primary school all-digital, added new language courses, and added France's first International Baccalaureate curriculum.

2014 was the first year of GEMS operation of the school, and it announced an intention to double or triple Ecole des Roches's 400-student boarding and day enrolment over five years. The school offers a combination of the British and French curriculums. As of 2015, it also offered French immersion courses for international students during the summer, French-immersion exchange programmes throughout the year, and summer English courses.

GEMS in India

GEMS International School in Gurgaon, Haryana opened in 2010.

GEMS Modern Academy in Kochi, Kerala opened in 2019. The school is set in an 8.3-acre campus in Smart City and offers an International Baccalaureate syllabus as well as the Cambridge curriculum.

GEMS in the United States
In the fall of 2012, GEMS Education opened its first school in the United States, Little GEMS International-Chicago, a pre-school in Chicago's Lincoln Park neighborhood. It is an upscale preschool, and operates extended hours. It accepts ages six weeks to five years, and in addition to personal, social, emotional, creative, and intellectual development, children are exposed to world languages and digital literacy at an early age.

Also in Chicago, the company opened GEMS World Academy-Chicago in September 2014. It is an International Baccalaureate school, and is located in Chicago's Lakeshore East development. The  preschool to eighth grade building opened in 2014, and garnered attention for its architecture accented with color. An upper school for grades nine through 12 was scheduled to open in the fall of 2017. The school offers a global education and provides links with students around the world. Students receive laptops and specially equipped iPads, which are used particularly in weekly field studies around Chicago.

In 2014, GEMS World Academy-Chicago instituted the citywide $50,000 GEMS Education Chicago Teacher Award. The inaugural winner, in June 2014, was Matthew Cunningham, a teacher at Frederic Chopin Elementary School in Ukrainian Village in Chicago's West Side.

In 2013, GEMS Education sought to find a location to build a school on the Upper East Side of New York City; proceedings were eventually abandoned amidst litigation relating to property contracts.

In the early 2010s, GEMS' consultancy arm, GEMS Education Solutions, partnered in managing some U.S. schools. In 2009 Manny Rivera, at the time CEO of GEMS Education Solutions and GEMS Americas, formed Global Partnership Schools with former New York City Schools Chancellor Rudy Crew. Global Partnership Schools, in partnership with GEMS Education Solutions, and financed by newly available three-year federal School Improvement Grants (SIG), managed some previously failing schools in the U.S. beginning in 2010. Results, as with many SIG recipients from 2010 to 2012, were mixed; in August 2012 the company declined to renew its contract with one school district. The combined partnership company also sponsored two new charter schools in Ohio called Believe to Achieve Academies beginning in the fall of 2012; they closed in the spring of 2014 due to inability to meet enrollment goals.

Gems World Academy was looking to sell its campus in Chicago's East Loop area for $150 million in a sale-leaseback transaction, The Real Deal reported July 9, 2020.

GEMS in sub-Saharan Africa
GEMS opened its first school in sub-Saharan Africa in Kenya – GEMS Cambridge International School in Nairobi – in September 2012.
 
When Cambridge set up operations in Kenya, it signed a deal with a local firm to construct Gems Cambridge International School located on Magadi Road in Karen, Nairobi County, at the cost of Ksh3 billion. The school's capacity is 2,000 students, including boarders, from kindergarten through year 13. It offers the British curriculum, and IGCSE exams as well as British-style A-levels for graduates. In 2014, a 6-lane, 400-metre tartan track was completed on the school grounds, to aid young athletes; it also allows Kenya's elite athletes to train in their speed work. The school's additional sports facilities include hockey fields and basketball and tennis courts.

In August 2015, the GEMS Cambridge International School in Nairobi launched the Lego  Education Innovation Studio, a $55,000 facility and program in partnership with Lego Education that teaches and strengthens Science, Technology, Engineering, Math (STEM) and literacy at all age levels, and aims to encourage critical thinking, creativity, innovation, problem-solving, and collaboration. The curriculum and equipment provide a hands-on learning approach to involve students in their own learning process.

In 2019, GEMS acquired the Nairobi-based Hillcrest International Schools. In January 2022, GEMS announced having an in-principle agreement to sell to Braeburn Schools Limited the Hillcrest schools.
Varkey's company sold most of its shareholding from its assets from Regis School in Runda to a local businessman.
Gems Cambridge founder Sunny Varkey is set to exit the Kenyan market, marking 11 years since his company invested in their inaugural local project.

GEMS Cambridge International School in Uganda opened in September 2013, in the Ugandan capital city of Kampala. It serves pupils ages 3 to 18, with the British curriculum geared toward IGCSE, AS-level, and A-level qualifications. According to the school, it also encourages an appreciation of Ugandan culture and giving back to the local community. In 2015 the Uganda Olympic Committee signed a partnership with the school, to incorporate Olympic studies and training as part of the school's physical education curriculum. The school's sports facilities also provide training grounds for a variety of national sports teams and hosting grounds for competitions.

GEMS in Southeast Asia
GEMS operated GEMS World Academy (Singapore), its first school in Southeast Asia, from September 2014 to June 2021. It is now operated by TPG Capital-backed XCL Education as the XCL World Academy, after its acquisition from GEMS. Financial terms were not disclosed.

In September 2015, GEMS opened GEMS International School Pearl City, in Penang, Malaysia. The school is for ages three to 18, and follows the British National Curriculum leading to the IGCSE/CIE and AS/A-level qualifications. It also accommodates the Malaysian Education Ministry guidelines and teaches Malaysian language, Mandarin, Malaysian social studies, and Islamic and moral studies. It was the first international school in Mainland Penang. Facilities include a theatre, music and art rooms, a dance studio, sport halls, a football field, swimming pools, and basketball courts. The school planned to grow to 1,500 students within five years, eventually accommodating 3,000 students.

Philanthropy 
The owners run the Varkey Foundation, formerly known as the Varkey GEMS Foundation, as their family philanthropic arm.

References

External links

Education companies of the United Arab Emirates
GEMS schools
Education companies established in 2000
Companies based in Dubai
2000 establishments in the United Arab Emirates